Campomanesia is a genus in the family Myrtaceae described as a genus in 1794. It is native to South America and Trinidad.

Species 
Species in this genus include.

References

External links
 Campomanesia in GRIN

 
Myrtaceae genera
Flora of South America